Greg "Chevy" Chevalier (born Albany, New York) is a retired American soccer midfielder who played professionally in the USL First Division.

Player
Chevalier attended Monroe-Woodbury High School in Central Valley, New York.  He then played college soccer at the University of Albany from 1999 to 2002.  In 2003, Chevalier played as an amateur with the Albany Blackwatch Highlanders of the fourth division Premier Development League.  He scored nine goals and was named to the All-PDL team.  He began his professional career in 2004 with the Pittsburgh Riverhounds in the USL Second Division.  On April 9, 2005, the Silverbacks announced the signing of Chevalier.  In April 2006, the Silverbacks released Chevalier during the preseason.  He then signed with the Riverhounds.  He also played four games for the Atlanta Silverbacks U23s of the PDL.  In 2007, he took the season off after getting married.  In April 2008, Chevalier returned to professional soccer with the Atlanta Silverbacks.

Coach
Chevalier began coaching in 2000 and has held positions at the high school and Super Y-League levels. He currently is located in Atlanta, GA coaching for Atlanta Spurs FC alongside Ted Macdougall and Paul Smith.

References

External links
 Atlanta Silverbacks Player Profile

1985 births
Living people
American soccer coaches
American soccer players
Albany BWP Highlanders players
Atlanta Silverbacks players
Atlanta Silverbacks U23's players
Pittsburgh Riverhounds SC players
USL First Division players
USL Second Division players
USL League Two players
Albany Great Danes men's soccer players
Sportspeople from Albany, New York
People from Woodbury, Orange County, New York
Association football midfielders